Maclure Glacier (also McClure Glacier) is on Mount Maclure in the Sierra Nevada crest of Yosemite National Park in Tuolumne County, California, United States. The glacier is named after William Maclure. Both the Maclure Glacier and the Lyell Glacier, located nearby on Mount Lyell, have retreated since their first discovery.

See also
List of glaciers in the United States

References

Glaciers of California
Glaciers of Tuolumne County, California
Glaciers of the Sierra Nevada (United States)